Chahar Deh (also Romanized as Chahār Deh) is a village in Donbaleh Rud-e Shomali Rural District, Dehdez District, Izeh County, Khuzestan Province, Iran. At the 2006 census, its population was 200, in 33 families.

References 

Populated places in Izeh County